Čebine is a settlement in the Municipality of Trbovlje in central Slovenia. It lies in the hills west of the town of Trbovlje. The area is part of the traditional region of Styria. It is now included with the rest of the municipality in the Central Sava Statistical Region.

Name
Čebine was attested in historical sources as Heyliges Crewtz in 1498 and heiliges Kreuz in 1535, based on the name of the local church.

History
The Communist Party of Slovenia was established on April 18, 1937 at the Barlič farm in Čebine.

Church
The local church is dedicated to the Holy Cross and belongs to the Parish of Sveta Planina. It has a medieval core, but it was extensively rebuilt in the 18th century.

References

External links
Čebine on Geopedia

Populated places in the Municipality of Trbovlje